Forest Glade can refer to:

A glade
Forest Glade, Windsor, Ontario, Canada
Forest Glade, Texas, USA